Justin Ogenia (born 5 February 1999) is a professional footballer who plays as a right back for Eindhoven in the Dutch Eerste Divisie. Born in mainland Netherlands, he plays for the Curaçao national team.

Professional career

Willem II 
On 2 March 2019, Ogenia signed a professional contract with  Willem II. Ogenia made his professional debut with Willem II in a 1-0 Eredivisie loss to Feyenoord on 1 September 2019.

Loan to FC Eindhoven 
In the 2020 winter transfer window, Ogenia was loaned out to Eerste Divisie side FC Eindhoven.

FC Eindhoven 
In October 2021, Ogenia permanently joined FC Eindhoven on a one-year contract, with a club option for a second year. However, he suffered a season-ending knee injury in his first training with the team.

International career
Ogenia was born in the Netherlands, and is of Curaçaoan and Aruban descent. He was called up to the Curaçao U20s for 3 2017 CONCACAF U-20 Championship qualifying matches in 2016.

References

External links
 
 
 BDFutbol Profile
 Kicker Proile

1999 births
Living people
Sportspeople from Helmond
Curaçao footballers
Curaçao international footballers
Dutch footballers
Dutch people of Curaçao descent
Dutch people of Aruban descent
Association football fullbacks
Willem II (football club) players
FC Eindhoven players
Eredivisie players
Eerste Divisie players
Footballers from North Brabant